Duet for One is a 1986 British drama film adapted from the play, a two-hander by Tom Kempinski, about a world-famous concert violinist named Stephanie Anderson who is suddenly struck with multiple sclerosis. It is set in London, and directed by Andrei Konchalovsky. The story is based on the life of cellist Jacqueline du Pré, who was diagnosed with MS, and her husband, conductor Daniel Barenboim, and only marginally fictionalized.

Synopsis
Stephanie Anderson, a world-famous violinist, becomes unable to play because of multiple sclerosis. A depressed psychiatrist she sees is unable to help with her rage and frustration. Her star pupil, realizing he will learn nothing more, leaves her. Her husband departs with his young secretary, and her accompanist dies. Her fierce desire to be alone in her pain alienates everybody except her faithful maid. She gives all her musical effects to a totter (an itinerant scrap merchant), who she asks into her bed as well. Watching a videotape of a concert triumph, she takes an overdose but the maid breaks in to try and save her. In an epilogue, which may be a dream, the psychiatrist has become a friend while her ex-husband and former pupil come back to see her, as does the ghost of her accompanist.

Primary cast
Julie Andrews: Stephanie Anderson
Alan Bates: David Cornwallis
Max von Sydow: Dr. Louis Feldman
Rupert Everett: Constantine Kassanis
Margaret Courtenay: Sonia Randvich
Cathryn Harrison: Penny Smallwood
Sigfrit Steiner: Leonid Lefimov
Macha Méril: Anya
Liam Neeson: Totter
Siobhan Redmond: Totter's wife
Paula Figgett: Totter's Daughter

Reception
The film gained positive reviews.

Awards
Golden Globe for Best Actress in a Drama Role: Julie Andrews (Nominated)

Stage play
Duet for One premiered at the Bush Theatre in 1980 with Frances de la Tour and David de Keyser in the leading roles. Kempinski and de la Tour were married at the time, and he wrote the role with her in mind. It had a successful run in the West End. The Broadway version, starring Anne Bancroft and Max von Sydow, opened December 17, 1981, and ran until January 2, 1982, for a total of 20 performances. A major revival was staged by the Almeida Theatre in 2009, starring Juliet Stevenson and Henry Goodman. This revival too was lauded by the critics, and it subsequently transferred to the Vaudeville Theatre in the West End.

In 2023 a new production was staged at the Orange Tree Theatre, in the production the gender of Dr. Feldman was switched. Actress Maureen Beattie played the psychiatrist with Tara Fitzgerald as Stephanie.

References

External links

1986 films
1986 drama films
American drama films
British drama films
American independent films
1980s English-language films
Films directed by Andrei Konchalovsky
Films set in London
Films shot at EMI-Elstree Studios
Golan-Globus films
British films based on plays
Films about classical music and musicians
Two-handers
1986 independent films
Films produced by Menahem Golan
Films produced by Yoram Globus
1980s American films
1980s British films